This is a list of the songs that placed number one in the United States during 2023. The Billboard Hot 100 is a chart that ranks the best-performing songs in the US. Its data is compiled by Luminate Data and published by American music magazine Billboard. The chart is based on each song's weekly physical and digital sales collectively, the amount of airplay impressions it receives on American radio stations, and its audio and video streams on online digital music platforms.
"Flowers", the 2023 single by American singer Miley Cyrus, is the year's longest reigning number-one song on the Hot 100, having spent six weeks at the top spot. 

Six artists have charted at number one in 2023 so far, with American country singer Morgan Wallen reaching the top spot for the first time.

Chart history

Number-one artists

See also
 List of Billboard 200 number-one albums of 2023
 List of Billboard Global 200 number ones of 2023
 List of Billboard Hot 100 top-ten singles in 2023
 2023 in American music

References

United States Hot 100
2023
Hot 100 number-one singles